All That is Solid Melts into Air is the debut novel by the Irish writer Darragh McKeon.

Using the Chernobyl disaster as a backdrop, the novel chronicles the collapse and ultimate end of the Soviet Union. McKeon was shortlisted for the Newcomer of the Year award at the 2014 Irish Book Awards.

References

2014 Irish novels
Novels set in the Soviet Union
2014 debut novels
Chernobyl disaster in fiction
Viking Press books